Allen Schramm (born  1961) is an American former competitive figure skater. He is the 1978 Nebelhorn Trophy champion, 1978 Grand Prix International St. Gervais champion, 1979 Prague Skate silver medalist, and 1980 NHK Trophy bronze medalist.

He is the son of Ray Schramm, who skated for Ice Follies with his twin brother, Roy. Originally from San Francisco, Allen Schramm was coached by Peter Dunfield at New York's Sky Rink and represented the Skating Club of New York. He and his wife, Angela Schramm (Greenhow), coached at the Detroit Skating Club in Bloomfield Hills, Michigan until moving to Texas after 2002. They now work at the Stars Figure Skating Club of Texas.

Competitive highlights

References 

1960s births
American male single skaters
Living people
Place of birth missing (living people)
Sportspeople from Texas